Macrocoma dubia is a species of leaf beetle endemic to the Canary Islands. It was first described by Thomas Vernon Wollaston in 1864 as a species of Pseudocolaspis. It has been reported from Fuerteventura and Lanzarote.

References

dubia
Endemic beetles of the Canary Islands
Beetles described in 1864
Taxa named by Thomas Vernon Wollaston